Charles Anthony Thomas (né Jacobs; born December 7, 1948) is an Academy Award nominated American television and film producer. He was a producer for the feature film Dead Poets Society for which he was nominated for the Academy Award for Best Picture in 1989, Insomnia, among other films.

He is also the producer of many successful television series from the 1970s into the 1990s such as Golden Girls for which he won the Primetime Emmy Award for Outstanding Comedy Series twice and won three consecutive Golden Globe Awards for Best Television Series – Musical or Comedy. Thomas was the producer of Blossom and many other TV series. He is the co-founder of Witt/Thomas Productions.

Early life and family
Born Charles Anthony Jacobs in Hollywood, California, Thomas is the son of actor and philanthropist Danny Thomas and his wife, Rose Marie (Cassaniti) Thomas. His father was of Lebanese descent and his mother was of Italian descent. He is the younger brother of actresses Terre Thomas and Marlo Thomas.

Career
Thomas began working in Hollywood film/TV production at Screen Gems as an associate producer on the acclaimed television movie Brian's Song. In 1974, he teamed with producer Paul Junger Witt and wife Susan Harris to form a TV production company, Witt/Thomas Productions (alternately Witt/Thomas/Harris Productions), which produced numerous successful television series from the 1970s into the 1990s.

He has produced many TV series, including The Practice (1976–1977), Nurses, Herman's Head, Soap, Blossom, Empty Nest, Benson, Beauty and the Beast, The Golden Girls, Brotherly Love, The John Larroquette Show and It's a Living. He was a producer for the feature film Dead Poets Society.

Other endeavors
Thomas serves as a member of the ALSAC/St. Jude Boards of Directors and Governors, directing the operation of the St. Jude Children's Research Hospital that his father had founded.

Personal life
Thomas married Ann Souder on Christmas Eve 2005 in Montecito, California.

Filmography
He was a producer in all films unless otherwise noted.

Film

Television

Miscellaneous crew

As writer

As an actor

As director

Production manager

Soundtrack

References

External links

 
 

1948 births
American people of Italian descent
American people of Lebanese descent
People from Hollywood, Los Angeles
Television producers from California
Living people
People from Greater Los Angeles
Filmmakers who won the Best Film BAFTA Award